The 1st Filmfare Awards were held on 21 March 1954, honoring the best in Hindi cinema in 1953. 

That year they were known as the Clare Awards, after Clare Mendonça, a film critic of The Times of India who had died in the same year.

Baiju Bawra & Do Bigha Zamin won 2 awards each, with the former winning Best Actress (for Meena Kumari) and Best Music Director (for Naushad for ''Tu Ganga Ki Mauj''), and the latter winning Best Film and Best Director (for Bimal Roy), thus becoming the most-awarded films at the ceremony,  

Dilip Kumar won his first Best Actor award for his performance in Daag.

The Awards

In a short ceremony held at Metro Cinema in Bombay (now Mumbai), awards in only 5 categories were handed out.  The Chief Guest of function was George Allen, US Ambassador to India. The ceremony was compared by actor David, and it started with actress Nalini Jaywant singing the national anthem. This was followed by song and dance performance by various actors, musical performances by Talat Mehmood, Geeta Roy and Mohammed Rafi. Next two performances were classical dance performances by Vyjayanthimala and Surya Kumari. The finale of the performance section was a folk-dance performance, "Lure of Rajasthan" by Kamini Kaushal and her troupe.

This led to the section where David announced the awards. No nominations were announced, just the winners. Keep with the voting process, where the readers of the magazine, decided the winners through postal votes, even the awards were given away by readers, chosen via a lucky draw. For example, the Best Film trophy was given by Ambassador Allen to a reader, Saijuddin from Hyderabad, who in turn presented it to Bimal Roy. This was followed by Best Actress which was won by Meena Kumari for Baiju Bawra and Best Actor went to Dilip Kumar for Daag. Next, ace music director Naushad won his first and only Filmfare Award, for Best Music for Baiju Bawra. The final award, the Best Director was won by Bimal Roy, present by Sonny Cordiero, a reader from Mumbai.

Incidentally, Bimal Roy and Dilip Kumar were the first winners of Best Director and Best Actor respectively, and remained almost 6 decades later, the ones with the most wins in either category, with 7 and 8 awards respectively. Additionally, Meena Kumari, who was the first winner for Best Actress, held the record for the most wins in the category (4) for 13 years, till her record was broken by Nutan with her 5th win at the 26th Filmfare Awards.  Fearing similar mob of fans as outside Metro Cinema, the venue of the award party was not announced publicly. Later, around hundred invitees gathered at Wellington Gymkhana Club.

Hollywood star Gregory Peck was invited to be the guest of honour at the awards but couldn't make it to the function since his flight from Colombo got delayed. However, Peck did attend the after-party banquet that followed the award night at Wellington Gymkhana Club, Mumbai.

Best Film
Do Bigha Zamin

Best Director
Bimal Roy – Do Bigha Zamin

Best Actor
Dilip Kumar – Daag

Best Actress
Meena Kumari – Baiju Bawra

Best Music Director
Naushad – Baiju Bawra for Tu Ganga Ki Mauj

See also
 2nd Filmfare Awards
 Filmfare Awards

References

External links
 Winner and nomination of 1st Filmfare Awards at Internet Movie Database
 

Filmfare Awards
1954 in Indian cinema
1953 film awards